Boyhood (Otrochestvo) is the second novel in Leo Tolstoy's autobiographical trilogy, following Childhood and followed by Youth. The novel was first published in the Russian literary journal Sovremennik in 1854.

Later in life, Tolstoy expressed his unhappiness with the book.

See also

Leo Tolstoy bibliography

External links

 (trans. by C.J. Hogarth)

References

1854 Russian novels
Novels by Leo Tolstoy
Russian autobiographical novels
Works originally published in Sovremennik